Hilde is a 2009 German biographical film directed by Kai Wessel
and starring Heike Makatsch, Dan Stevens and Monica Bleibtreu. It depicts the life of the German actress Hildegard Knef.

Plot
In 1966 Hildegard Knef returns to Germany. While she prepares for a concert she thinks back to the beginnings of her career. Flashbacks show how she became an actress and then started a second career as a singer.

Cast
Heike Makatsch: Hildegard Knef
Dan Stevens: David Cameron
Monica Bleibtreu: Else Bongers
Hanns Zischler: Erich Pommer
Johanna Gastdorf: Frieda Knef
Trystan Wyn Puetter: Kurt Hirsch
Michael Gwisdek: grandfather
Roger Cicero: Ricci Blum
Anian Zollner: Ewald von Demandowsky
Sylvester Groth: Boleslaw Barlog
Fritz Roth: step-father
Hary Prinz: Willi Forst
Jeroen Willems: Anatole Litvak
Stanley Townsend: David O. Selznick

Reception
Kirk Honeycutt's wrote "Hilde" was an "outstanding biopic about Hildegard Knef with a captivating performance" by Heike Makatsch but also felt the screenplay was "at times superficial".  Variety's Derek Elley attested Heike Makatsch a "remarkably cohesive performance" which was true to each "physical mannerism" of Hildegard Knef. "Easy on the eyes but rarely going more than skin-deep" was his roundup.

References

External links
 
 
 

2009 films
2009 biographical drama films
2000s German-language films
Films set in Berlin
Films set in West Germany
Films set in the United States
Films shot in Cologne
Films scored by Martin Todsharow
Biographical films about actors
German biographical drama films
Films set in the 1940s
Films set in the 1950s
Films set in the 1960s
2009 drama films
2000s German films